Marella Vania Salamat (born 24 April 1994) is a Filipina road cycling racer and former bowler.

Education
Salamat attended the University of the East where she pursued a course on dentistry. She decided to halt her studies on her second year to give more focus on her cycling career. She later resumed her bid to obtain a degree and began taking an online marketing course by the Southville International Colleges.

Career
Salamat is a former bowling athlete who shifted to competitive cycling in 2013. She was scouted by national cycling coach Cesar Lobramonte in 2013 when she was biking with Edward Coo and Orlyn Batistin, her bowling coaches, at the Mall of Asia grounds as part of her cross training. Lobramonte encouraged her to shift to the sport.

She then won a gold medal at the 2015 Southeast Asian Games at the women's individual time trial event.

At the 2016 World University Cycling Championship, Salamat won a bronze medal at the women's road race event.

Salamat placed eighth at the nine-legged 2017 Biwase Cup Tour of Vietnam while in the team classification event she led the Philippines to a seventh-place finish.

Major results

2015
 Southeast Asian Games
1st  Time trial
8th Road race
2016
 3rd  Road race, World University Cycling Championship
 8th Overall Tour of Thailand
 9th Time trial, Asian Road Championships
2017
 5th Road race, Southeast Asian Games
 6th Overall Tour of Thailand
 8th Time trial, Asian Road Championships
2019
 Southeast Asian Games
7th Time trial
7th Road race
2022
 6th Time trial, Southeast Asian Games

References

External links

1994 births
Living people
Filipino female cyclists
University of the East alumni
Sportspeople from Ilocos Sur
Southeast Asian Games medalists in cycling
Southeast Asian Games gold medalists for the Philippines
Competitors at the 2015 Southeast Asian Games
Competitors at the 2017 Southeast Asian Games
Competitors at the 2019 Southeast Asian Games
Competitors at the 2021 Southeast Asian Games